Elijah Barrett Prettyman (1830–1907) was the second principal of Maryland State Normal School (now Towson University).

Prettyman graduated from Dickinson College. He was a teacher and principal in Anne Arundel County for over 15 years. He later became the State Superintendent of Public Instruction and Principal of the Normal School.

References
Presidential Biographies - Towson Archives

Dickinson College alumni
Presidents of Towson University
1830 births
1907 deaths
Place of birth missing